Jagged Mountain is a mountain on Vancouver Island, British Columbia, Canada, located  east of Woss and  north of Mount Abel.

See also
 List of mountains in Canada

References

Vancouver Island Ranges
One-thousanders of British Columbia
Rupert Land District